is a Japanese manga series by Hiromitsu Takeda. It was published by Fujimi Shobo's magazine Dragon Age Pure, and later Monthly Dragon Age, after the former magazine ceased publishing. It has been adapted into an anime series by AIC that aired on Tokyo MX in the fall of 2011. It is licensed in North America by Crunchyroll (also known as Funimation until 2022) under the title Maken-ki! Battling Venus. Two OVA episodes animated by AIC and Xebec were released at February 29, 2012 and September 25, 2013. They were bundled with the eighth and eleventh volumes of the manga respectively. A second season, titled , was animated by Xebec and aired in 2014.

Plot
Takeru Ooyama has enrolled at Tenbi Academy, a private prep high school that converted from all-girls to co-ed. Hoping to have a life full of ogling pretty girls, he reunites with childhood friend Haruko Amaya, who shows him around school. However, he learns that the school is for students who possess magical and spiritual energies called Elements and who wield crafted weapons known as Makens. The students engage in school sanctioned combat matches that showcase their powers. While his own ability and Maken is not apparent at first, Takeru soon finds himself surrounded by girls, including Inaho Kushiya, an attractive girl who says she's his fiancée, and Kodama Himegami, a popular blonde who says she wants to kill him.

Characters

Main characters

The main protagonist of the series, Takeru is a first-year high schooler who enrolls at Tenbi Academy after having attended an all-boys middle school. His childhood friend and fellow disciple, Haruko Amaya, also attends the school as does Inaho Kushiya, who claims that she is his fiancée. He ends up sharing his room with the two girls, as well as Kodama Himegami.

Several years before the story, when Takeru was nine and three-quarters, his family dojo was challenged by Tesshin Kushiya. His mother, Atsuma, was killed by Tesshin before his eyes. This incident caused him to hold a deep resentment for his father and uncle due to neither of them being there to protect them. As a result, he tends to take the girl's side whenever one gets into a fight with a guy; indicating he has intense white knight syndrome. His abilities originally manifest under extreme stress, as in the case where he protected Azuki. When he defended Kodama, he used "Blood Pointer", which was later described as "absorbing Element from the people around him through his mouth". Following the battle with the Venus Unit, Takeru undergoes extra training with Minori Rokujou in order to both increase and gain better control of his powers. He later learns that he is blood related to Kodama's brother.

Takeru was one of the three students that Gen's Element Detector, Keronbo, could not initially identify, but (a month later) he was given his Maken, "Overblow", which causes his target's Maken to overflow with Element and be rendered useless "like a car engine that blows out". However, if the opponent has an evolved Maken and can perfectly control/contain the surge, it can have the opposite effect and thereby empower the opponent.

A second-year student who is the student council vice president, and the head of one of the dorms. She is a childhood friend of Takeru Ooyama, whom she trained with at his family's dojo, and for whom she harbors romantic feelings for although she is unwilling to admit it. After learning that Kodama and Inaho are moving into Takeru's room, she decides to move in as well. She is very jealous of the attention Takeru gives the other girls and tends to beat him almost by reflex whenever he does anything even remotely perverted. Haruko is well-endowed and Kodama considers her to be the strongest maiden at Tenbi Academy. Haruko's Maken, is a sword that is suspected to be one of the original Eight Legendary Maken. Murakumo cannot be unsheathed unless Haruko has strong feelings and fights an opponent with comparable power. Haruko unleashed a little of Murakumo's power when she fought a student named Kumi Amio. In her battle with Demitra Midia, she unsheathed it to reveal a blade surrounded with light. Not only are Haruko's attack big enough to destroy barriers, but they are controlled enough that she can spare the life of someone in the sword's path.

Her Maken, "Yasakani", allows her to command three shikigami named Kaguzuchi, Ikajichi and Nojichi, a trio of doll-sized familiars who follow her around and call her "ojou-sama" (literally "my lady" or "miss" in English) and who can lift people up as well as project fire (Kaguzuchi), lightning (Ikajichi) or wood (Nojichi) attacks. She regularly steps on the boys for their annoying and lecherous antics. She initially sees Takeru as a potential enemy who stole her first kiss, but rooms with him after noticing that he bears a special mark on his chest, and has a scent very similar to her brother's. She develops feelings for Takeru, although not like the other girls as when she was asked whom she likes, she responded that she loved someone long ago. Her hobbies include shopping, especially for lingerie and rare stuffed animals. When on night patrol, she was attracted to a rare King Penguin stuffed animal, and was captured by the Finnian twins of Venus. She later shows a fear of ghosts and spirits outside her own magic; in one instance, she's frightened by a ghost story that Haruto Kirishima admits he'd embellished.

Kodama later reveals that she has extraordinary abilities. In the battle with Venus, Kodama uses her Maken to summon larger spirits that are as powerful as the Legendary Eight Maken, and are comparable in strength to Martha Minerva or Minori Rokujou. The Kamigari are highly interested in her as a key to unleashing the power in Amanohara. The Venus Unit kidnaps her and, later on, Ouken has the Kamigari try to capture her on the summer training island. It is revealed that Kodama is the daughter of Yatsune, the former Yamata no Orochi, and that her servants are actually Yatsune's incarnations; each of which had been able to manifest one of the original Eight Maken. Kodama inherited her mother's powers but was sealed away on top on Mount Amanohara. Many years later, after her seal was weakened by Minori, Kodama used her Element to manifest an incarnation of herself. She later realizes that Takeru Ooyama is a descendant of her brother.

The self-proclaimed fiancée of Takeru Ooyama. She feels strongly for Takeru, and although he does not remember her much, she has decided to wait until he fully does. She holds Takeru's father in high regard. Upon revealing this, Takeru gets upset and ignores her, which causes her to cry. Takeru later apologizes to her after Kengo confronts him. However, in the anime, she cries after Takeru tells her that he cannot remember a childhood promise. At first, Inaho was one of the three students that the Element detector, Keronbo, could not measure. However, she manifests her Maken when she saves Takeru and a cat from a falling boulder. She names the cat Monji and usually wears him on her head. Her Maken, "Kamudo", is a gauntlet that greatly increases her strength and speed. She is the star of the bonus four panel series of Maken-ki comics where she is presented in super deformed mode.

Students
 is Takeru's classmate who joins security committee of Maken-ki. He and Takeru become friends after having excused themselves from class in order to peek at girls during their physical examinations. He has a crush on Kodama. His Maken, "Point Man", lets him exchange himself or other people with an item in their place. Kengo is voiced by Satoshi Tsuruoka, and English dubbed by Scott Freeman in the first season and by Anthony Bowling in the second season.
 is a hot-tempered second year student who typically sports a small bandage on her nose. She is a  member of Maken-ki. After Takeru Ooyama's interference in Azuki's duel with Kai Kuragasa, the latter feels humiliated and a conflict starts between them. However, both eventually become friends when Takeru forgives Syria Ootsuka. She works at a maid café named Macaroon Mansion. Her Maken, "Hawk", is a mechanized boot which boosts her leg strength, granting her superior agility and speed. As a result, she usually fights using her legs. Azuki is voiced by Misuzu Togashi, and English dubbed by Morgan Garrett.
 is a Magical enforcer Committee Member of Maken-ki. She's obsessed with Haruko, and despises Takeru for spending so much time with her. When she was younger, she had made a lunch only for bullies to harass her until Haruko drove them off and offered Minaya some of her own lunch. After a student controlled by the Kamigari fights her and Takeru, she is rescued again by Haruko. Uruchi is voiced by Shizuka Furuya, and is English dubbed by Cherami Leigh.
 is the student council president at Tenbi Academy. She wears glasses and her hair is braided. She is shy around boys and even states that she dislikes men. In the anime, she is very attracted to Akaya from Venus, whom she falls for at their first meeting because (unlike the peeping guys) he appears like a gentleman. Despite her shyness, Furan is very strict when it comes to the duties of Maken-ki duties that need to be carried out. The anime features a recurring gag where the other female Maken-ki members expose Furan's panties in front of the guys to reveal various animal prints such as a bear, cat, and frog; this is an extension from a manga scene during the female bonding time at the summer cabin. Ouken reveals that her fear of men is because, as an advanced talent, she was chosen by Kamigari to be one of his mistresses and was ravished in place of Yuka. Furan's Maken, "Habaya", is a bow that fires homing light arrows. Furan is voiced by Aya Gōda, and she is English dubbed by Brittney Karbowski.
 is the student council treasurer. She is a close friend of Furan, whom she likes to tease. Yuka appears to be carefree most of the time but also very cunning and encourages Maken-ki activities that involve some kind of other work that needs to be done. For instance, she sets up a competition between Maken-ki and Venus where the players use broom sticks to push a bar of soap around an empty pool. She has a friendly personality like her sister Tomiko, who is Takeru's homeroom teacher; they sometimes coordinate activities. She later reveals that for many generations, the Amado family has been serving the Rokujou family as their oniwaban (ninja). Yuka is voiced by Natsumi Takamori, and English dubbed by Jamie Marchi.
 is the student council secretary. Her Maken, "Comic Star", is the result of her love of manga, as she can draw something and bring it to reality. She is close friends with Chacha, and they often work together. Kimi is voiced by Misato, and English dubbed by Alexis Tipton.
 is a security committee member of Maken-ki; she has a dark complexion. Her Maken, "Compressor", allows her to change the shape and density of objects allowing her to do things such as extending a small broken plank into an enormous board. Chacha is voiced by Saeko Zōgō, and English dubbed by Trina Nishimura.
 is a first-year student who duels Azuki early on in the series. He wagers that if he wins he will date her. His Maken, "Full Metal", allows him to harden any part of his body into steel, granting him far greater strength and endurance. Although he loses the fight because of Takeru's interference, he continues to pursue Azuki from afar, including visiting her at the maid café where she works. Kai is voiced by Go Inoue, and English dubbed by Andrew T. Chandler.

Staff
 is the principal and physical education teacher at Tenbi Academy. She permits Inaho, Kodama and Haruko to live in Takeru's dorm room. She brandishes incredible power and control over Element, as she can break through amazingly powerful barriers with her bare hands, thanks to nothing more than (in her own words) her "fighting spirit". She ranks herself on the same level as Ouken Yamato. and was in the Maken-ki student group before the school was converted to an all-girls' academy. Her Maken, "Dragon Ace", is a pair of gauntlets that allow her to create heat sources and ignite them into fire-based attacks. Minori is voiced by Mina and English dubbed by Caitlin Glass.
 is the creator of the Maken in the school. He was in the Maken-ki student group before it was converted to an all-girls academy. He can create replica Maken which is done for each student at the academy. He is able to do this through his "Dark Element" which is later explained to be the Black Element, which is created by having all four of the main Elements in his body instead of the usual major and minor Elements. He is one of five people known to have this ability. Gen is voiced by Atsushi Imaruoka, and English dubbed by Robert McCollum.
 is the school nurse, art teacher and the staff adviser for Maken-ki. She and Minori were Maken-ki members. She has a large chest and curvaceous body that has drawn much attention from the boys and envy from the girls. She has the largest breasts in the series where a flashback in Episode 5 of Season 2 shows that they became really big when she was only 12. Despite her strange and immodest choices of clothing and healing practices, she is soft-spoken and acts shy at times. Minori later tells the boys that Aki is still a virgin. She knows Akaya from when they were schoolmates, and senses when he has been lying. In addition to her healing abilities, she has a Maken, "Valhelm", but it is more a diagnostic tool that allows her to determine what parts of a person are injured the most. In the anime, she has long, dark blue hair, and her appearance during the closing credits makes Haruko jealous. Aki is voiced by Hitomi Harada, and English dubbed by Heather Walker.
 is Takeru's homeroom teacher. She also was a member of Maken-ki before it had to become an all-girls academy. Minori sometimes acts as her classroom assistant. She has a pleasant personality like her younger sister Yuka Amato, although Minori thinks she has a sadistic side. Tomika is voiced by Yuki Matsuoka, and English dubbed by Shelley Calene-Black.

Venus
Venus is a mercenary unit that joins Tenbi Academy with the mission to search for the person who is trying to revive Yamata no Orochi. It is headed by Akaya Kodai, a former member of Maken-ki, and consists mainly of high school aged girls. It is later revealed that Venus has ties to Kamigari, and thus serve as the antagonists for a storyline where they plant barrier stones throughout Tenbi Academy, capture Kodama under the pretense that she trespassed into the Amanohara, and challenge Maken-ki to rescue her. The Venus unit uses Jingu, which are equipment used by the gods of their Western homelands; they are comparable to the Maken weapons used by the gods of the East.

 is the commander of Venus, and the sole male member. He is a former member of the Maken-ki student group, before it became an all-girls academy. While Venus stays at Tenbi Academy, Akaya challenges Takeru's viewpoint of wanting to protect all girls when he asks Takeru what he would do if a girl were to do bad things to another person. In a fight against Takeru, Akaya uses a Maken revolver named Swindle, where each bullet has a different ability including illusion, vision, and hypnosis, and dummy. Years before the series' present, Akaya leads the group of Tenbi Academy students to assault the female student years back, which results in the school's changing to all-girls, and also kills Takeru's mother; he reveals his past to have Takeru unleash his ultimate powers. He later says that the fight was mainly to test Takeru's strength to report it to the Kamigari. He appears in a disciplinary trial in front of Ouken, in which the latter punishes and brutalizes him, leaving in a state of stupor, however, it is later revealed he used his dummy bullet. Akaya intends to unmask the spirit that has taken over Ouken's body. Akaya is voiced by Makoto Yasumura, and his English dub voiced is provided by Eric Vale.
 is the vice commander of Venus. Her Jingu is a trident, which enhances her water-based abilities. She can create and control water, including spinning it so it destroys objects, hardening droplets to act like bullets, building a wall of water, and even drawing out moisture from a person. Yan Min regards her as a very strong fighter. She rarely smiles except at those whose power she acknowledges, such as Martha. Seven years before the start of the series, she is recruited by Akaya to join Venus after having grown up in a Southern European orphanage. Demitra is voiced by Rie Tanaka, and is English dubbed by Martha Harms.
 is a defense member of Venus, and an idol celebrity from America. While at Tenbi Academy, she flirts openly with Takeru, and makes the other girls jealous. When she fights Inaho, she uses professional wrestler moves. Her Jingu, Inverse, allows her to reverse situations at will. For instance, if someone rushes her, she can fling her away; when Takeru rushes, she instead nullifies his will to fight. However, when Takeru uses his Overblow ability, Syria loses her Inverse power, and is revealed to be a transgender woman. Despite the defeat Syria still pursues Takeru and gives him a kiss. Syria is voiced by Mariya Ise, and is English dubbed by Jad Saxton.
 is the special attack member of Venus; she dresses in Chinese clothes. Her Jingu is Kinben, which takes the form of a two-tailed whip. She can fuse Kinben into her body and use Reirii, which increases her speed and reduces her reaction time. Her abilities are lightning based; she can perform , which turns her fists into lightning and increases her power. Yang Ming is voiced by Satomi Akesaka in the Japanese dub, and Terri Doty in the English dub.
 is a defense member of Venus; she arrives after the other members have already settled in at Tenbi Academy. She is usually addressed by her last name. She initially appears as a carefree airhead who likes to keep her eyes closed in order to look more mature. Her Jingu, Aegis, allows her to open gates to other dimensions. She can make limbs disappear from and reappear in the current dimension so as to stop physical attacks. When she opens her eyes, she emits an inexhaustible stream of Element that engulfs everyone and creates a territory where she can further use powers such as selectively making the clothing of the girls disappear. She thus proclaims herself the Master of Lingerie. Minori ranks Martha the highest of the ability users. Martha is voiced by Rina Satō in the Japanese version, and by Leah Clark in the English dub.
The Tenbi Academy students refer to them as dolls. Their combined Jingu, Time/Space Keep, allows them to create barriers in which to imprison targets, prevent outsiders from intruding, or contain events within a space. After the last barrier is lifted, the damage to people within the space can be undone; this includes wounds inflicted. Minori ranks the twins as among the most powerful ability users. Lilou and Aililou are both voiced by Rina Hidaka in the Japanese dub, and by Michelle Hong in the English dub.

Kamigari
The Kamigari are a secret organization that works with the government by using the Elements and Maken. They originally gathered young people who possess special abilities to their organization, usually against their will. Those who opposed had their memories wiped. This continued until the government created Tenbi Academy to train the students. As a result, they partner with Tenbi Academy in selecting students to join their organization. After Venus leaves Tenbi Academy, they continue their experiments by possessing people and growing monsters to attack the Maken-ki members during their summer training activities. Ouken later decides to go after unlocking the secrets of Amanohara.

 is the leader of the Kamigari. One of his abilities is Soul Collector, which allows him to manipulate the memories of people; he did this on Akaya Kodai to make him think that he had assaulted a girl during the early years of Tenbi Academy. His Soul Collector can replenish Element by eating the souls from people. He is shown to have a split personality: his original one is calm and composed but has been suppressed for ten years; the newer personality is a power-hungry maniac that is hellbent on releasing the seal on Amanohara to unlock its secrets. During Akaya's disciplinary trial, the calm Ouken asks Akaya to stop the evil that has taken over him, after which he apparently dies and the power-hungry Ouken takes over. Eventually, after being heavily wounded by Takeru Ooyama, Ouken is killed by Kodama Himegami.
 is Ouken's granddaughter and a first-year student at Tenbi Academy. Her Doll House ability allows her to fashion a voodoo doll to manipulate her opponent. Because of her petite appearance, she is mistaken for being younger than her high school age by Haruko Amaya. She performs experiments where she manipulates some creatures and people with a chemical that is similar to Ouken's Soul Collector ability. She is one of the four Shishigami who serves Ouken. She is later revealed to be one of the clones from Takeru Yamato's DNA. Otohime is voiced by Yoshino Nanjō, and English dubbed by Carrie Savage.
 is Otohime's twin brother. His Cancel ability nullifies Element attacks. As one of the clones developed by Takeru Yamato, he becomes the vessel for Takeru after Ouken's death. Gouken is voiced by Yūto Suzuki, and English dubbed by Todd Haberkorn.
  is Otohime's sister. Kikyo is voiced by Shizuka Itō, and is English dubbed by Anastasia Muñoz.
 is Ouken's private secretary and a member of the Shishigami. Her ability allows her to "eat" someone and send them to another dimension. Her Maken, Missing Lip, originates from her shoe.
 is a Tenbi Academy alumnus who works for the Kamigari. His abilities are in electricity; he calls himself Lightning Panther, but Minori Rokujou, his former schoolmate, calls him Hopeless Leo. He first meets the Maken-ki gang at the island where they are doing summer training. Leo is voiced by Yutaka Furukawa, and is English dubbed by Aaron Roberts.
 is one of the four Shishigami who serve directly under Ouken. He initially poses as a botanist when the Maken-ki gang look for a flower to help Haruko recover. He later reveals himself to be a monster who took a drug that had Ouken's Element.
, is a member of the Shishigami, who is able to defeat Maken users without having to use a Maken or any drug enhancements. His power and ability is comparable to Ouken, and he can fight Maken users backhandedly. Ten years before the start of the series, he kills Takeru's mother, Atsuma, although he insists that she was already dying. His special ability is Blood Pointer, although he considers it an imitation to the ability he sees in Atsuma and consequently Takeru. As the adoptive father of Inaho, he puts her through harsh training so she will not abandon him, but is imprisoned by Kamigari for kidnapping and child abuse. Ouken later frees him on the condition that he fights Ouken's rival, Atsuma. After defeating her, Tesshin leaves Inaho in her family's care in order to do more training.
 is the ancestor of Ouken Yamato, and younger brother of Kodama's father. He acts as the underlying antagonist within Kamigari. His original name is Mousu no Mikoto, the second prince of the Yamato court. He originally hunts his brother and family, but is defeated by Kodama's brother Yabiko. However, he is able to maintain his existence by possessing people. He seals his soul in a jar, which is unearthed by Ouken, whom he possesses. He develops a secret lab of clones that would serve as a proper vessel for his soul; two of the chosen vessels are Otohime and Gouken.

Media

Manga

Volume list

Chapters not yet in tankōbon format
These chapters have yet to be published in a tankōbon volume.

Anime
An anime adaptation was announced on Monthly Dragon Ages official website in December 2010. In April 2011, Monthly Dragon Age confirmed that the anime series would air on television. Produced by AIC under the direction of Kōichi Ōhata with Yōsuke Kuroda as script supervisor and music by Cher Watanabe, the anime series began its first broadcast run on October 5, 2011. The first season adapts the first four volumes of the manga, while the second season features completely original, self-contained story arcs. 

The anime series is licensed by Funimation Entertainment (now known as Crunchyroll) in North America. A cast announcement was made on August 30, 2013, and the complete first season was released on home video on November 12. The series became available on the FunimationNOW video streaming service, and from March 2022, it became available on the Crunchyroll streaming service, after AT&T divested Crunchyroll to Sony Pictures Television in August 2021.

Maken-ki!

Doki Doki! Maken-ki! Himitsu no Kunren
The series released a six-episode special from December 21, 2011, to May 25, 2012, to Blu-ray only, each lasting ten minutes long titled . The episodes feature a "personal fitness program" with the main female characters of the series. Secret training exercises include: sit-ups, squats, kendo, push-ups and hamstring stretches with Haruko Amaya; push-ups, glute raises, bridges, squats, and hip abduction and adduction with Inaho Kushiya; front lunges, leg raises, arm-leg cross raises, kneeling sit-ups and cross-legged stretches with Kodama Himegami; leg lifts while doing a plank, handstand push-ups against a wall, high kicks, squatting with a bear as a weight and leg raise stretches with Azuki Shinatsu; push-ups, squats, knee elbow lifts, reverse wrestler bridges and leg raise stretches with Syria Ootsuka; and thigh stretches lying down, shoulder and chest stretches lying down and standing up, sustained push-ups and glute raise stretches with Aki Nijou.

Maken-ki! OVA

Maken-ki! Two

Maken-ki! Two Specials
Following the second season, the series released a five-episode special from March 28, 2014, to July 25, 2014, to Blu-ray/DVD only alongside pillowcases, each lasting five minutes long titled . The episodes feature "never-before-seen footage" including: Haruko Amaya continuously fantasizing about Takeru Ooyama during her morning routine; Monji temporarily giving Inaho Kushiya a cat tail and cat ears during playtime; an unknown student fantasizing about Aki Nijou while in the school infirmary; Kodama Himegami trying on different outfits with Rudolf secretly watching; and Kimi Satō desiring a bigger bust size.

Reception
Andy Hanley of UK Anime Network, in reviewing the first five episodes, found little originality in the anime series, which he called: "a cavalcade of tired old tropes and plot devices, from a visit to a hot springs to a 'date' where the couple are spied on by jealous friends, extending all the way out to the show's various characters and beyond."

Notes

References

Manga
Maken-ki manga volumes by Hiromitsu Takeda. Original Japanese version published by Kadokawa Shoten.

External links
Official manga website  
Official anime website 

Maken-Ki! 2 Season Two 

2013 anime OVAs
Anime International Company
IG Port franchises
Anime series based on manga
Fujimi Shobo manga
Funimation
Tokyo MX original programming
Harem anime and manga
Kadokawa Dwango franchises
Shōnen manga
Xebec (studio)